The  is an upcoming women's professional wrestling tag team championship owned by the World Wonder Ring Stardom promotion and will act as a developmental championship in the "New Blood" branch of events. The titles were introduced on December 16, 2022, and the inaugural champions are set to be crowned at Stardom New Blood Premium on March 25, 2023.

Title history
Despite first being mentioned in December 2022, the official design of the titles was revealed on March 7, 2023, during a press conference. They are inspired by the designs of New Japan Pro Wrestling's Strong Openweight Tag Team Championship, having the front larger plate and straps identically with them.

Inaugural tournament (2023)

Reigns

Notes

References

External links 
 World Wonder Ring Stardom's official website

World Wonder Ring Stardom championships
Women's professional wrestling championships
Women's professional wrestling tag team championships